Renuka Devi Barkataki (1932 - 2017) was an Indian politician from Assam. She was the Union Minister of state for education, social welfare and culture in the Janata Party government led by prime minister Morarji Desai from 1977 to 1979. In 1962, she was elected to the 3rd Lok Sabha from Barpeta constituency as an Indian National Congress candidate. In 1972, she was elected to the Assam legislative Assembly from Hajo constituency. In 1977, she was elected to the 6th Lok Sabha from Gauhati constituency as a Janata Party candidate. Later, she became the honorary secretary of the Assam state branch of the Indian Red Cross Society. She died on 14 August 2017 in a government hospital due to injuries.

References

External links 

India MPs 1962–1967
India MPs 1977–1979
1932 births
2017 deaths
Assam MLAs 1972–1978
Lok Sabha members from Assam
Women members of the Assam Legislative Assembly
Janata Party politicians
Indian National Congress politicians from Assam
People from Barpeta
Bharatiya Lok Dal politicians
20th-century Indian women politicians
20th-century Indian politicians
Women members of the Lok Sabha